A cannibal is an organism which eats others of its own species or kind.

Cannibal may also refer to:

 A person who engages in human cannibalism

Films
 Cannibal! The Musical (1993), directed by South Park co-creator Trey Parker
 Cannibal (2004 film), an alternate title of Canadian horror movie White Skin 
 Cannibal (2006 film), a German horror movie
 Cannibal (2010 film), a Belgian horror film
 Cannibal (2013 film), a Spanish-Romanian thriller
 The Cannibals (1970 film), originally I cannibali, an Italian drama
 The Cannibals (1988 film) (originally Os Canibais), a Portuguese drama

Literature
 The Cannibal (DeMille novel), a 1975 Joe Ryker book by Nelson DeMille
 The Cannibal (Hawkes novel), a 1949 novel by John Hawkes
 The Cannibals, an unfinished novel by Stephen King, which was the inspiration for his novel Under the Dome
 The Cannibals, a 1968 play by George Tabori

Music
 The Cannibals (band), a British garage punk band
 Cannibal (EP), a 2010 EP by Kesha, and its title song
"Cannibal" (Kesha song)
 Cannibal (Static-X album), 2007
 Cannibal (Wretched album), 2014
 "Cannibal", a 1987 song by Buster Poindexter from Buster Poindexter
 "Cannibals", a 1996 song by Mark Knopfler from Golden Heart
 "Cannibal", a 2011 song by Tally Hall from Good & Evil
 "Cannibal", a 2017 song by Converge from The Dusk in Us
 "Cannibals", a 2020 song by Neil Cicierega from Mouth Dreams
 "Cannibal" (Marcus Mumford song), 2022

People
 The Cannibal, a nickname for Belgian former professional cyclist Eddy Merckx (born 1945)
 The Cannibal, a nickname for Brazilian UFC fighter Alexandre Pantoja (born 1990)

Other uses
 Cannibal (camouflage)
 Cannibal (roller coaster), an amusement park attraction
 Cannibals (painting), a 2005 painting by Odd Nerdrum

See also
 
 Monsieur Cannibale (disambiguation)
 Cannibalism (disambiguation)
 Cannibalization (disambiguation)